Blago Barbieri (1 July 1923 – 12 August 1987) was a Yugoslav swimmer. He competed in the men's 200 metre breaststroke at the 1952 Summer Olympics.

References

1923 births
1987 deaths
Yugoslav male swimmers
Olympic swimmers of Yugoslavia
Swimmers at the 1952 Summer Olympics
Place of birth missing